Laura Marcus FBA (7 March 1956 – 22 September 2021) was a British literature scholar. She was Goldsmiths’ Professor of English Literature at New College, Oxford and published widely on 19th- and 20th-century literature and film, with particular interests in  autobiography, modernism, Virginia Woolf, and psychoanalysis.

Marcus won the Modern Language Association's James Russell Lowell Prize for her book The Tenth Muse: Writing about Cinema in the Modernist Period. In 2011, she was elected a Fellow of the British Academy.

Prior to joining Oxford, Marcus was Professor of English at Sussex University and Regius Professor of Rhetoric and English Literature at the University of Edinburgh.

She was an editor of the journal Women: a Cultural Review.

She died of pancreatic cancer on 22 September 2021 at the age of 65.

Books
 Auto/biographical Discourses: Theory, Criticism, Practice (1994) 
Virginia Woolf: Writers and their Work (1997/2004)
The Tenth Muse: Writing about Cinema in the Modernist Period (2007) 
Dreams of Modernity: Psychoanalysis, Literature, Cinema (2014)
Autobiography: a very short introduction (2018)
 co-ed. The Cambridge History of Twentieth-Century English Literature (2004)

References

1956 births
2021 deaths
Academics of the University of Edinburgh
Academics of the University of Sussex
British literary critics
British women literary critics
Deaths from pancreatic cancer
Fellows of New College, Oxford
Fellows of the British Academy